Planetone was a British independent record label, that issued ska recordings in the early 1960s.

History
The label's founder was Sonny Roberts. It is possible that this was the first black owned record label in England. The basement studio was located at a now demolished in Cambridge Road, Kilburn, London.

Some of the early recordings were by Rico's Combo, a group led by Jamaican trombonist Rico Rodriguez. Future saxophonist for The Foundations Mike Elliott, Jackie Foster and Jamaican singer Dandy Livingstone also released some recordings on the label.

References

External links
 45cat.com

British independent record labels